The Fun of It is Amelia Earhart's second book after her travelogue 20 Hrs., 40 Min.

Summary 
In it Earhart recollects how she became interested in being an aviator, and also becoming aviation editor for Cosmopolitan Magazine. In the book she also recounts her 1928 trans-Atlantic flight.

She also profiles the careers of other pioneering female flyers of her time. Earhart also encourages young women to follow their own careers and dreams. The title comes from her quote "Flying may not be all plain sailing, but the fun of it is worth the price."

Earhart's next book, Last Flight, would be published posthumously.

Development 
Earhart went over the proofs for the book in the days before her solo transatlantic flight in May 1932.

Lecture Tour 
In 1933 Earhart went on a lecture tour to promote the book. One of her stops was in Seattle, Washington.

References 

1932 non-fiction books
American autobiographies
Books by Amelia Earhart